Anna Elżbieta Gałecka (born 18 April 1974 in Gdynia) is a Polish windsurfer. She competed in the 2000 Summer Olympics and finished 11th in the Women's Mistral One Design event.

References

External links
 
 
 

1974 births
Living people
Polish windsurfers
Female windsurfers
Polish female sailors (sport)
Olympic sailors of Poland
Sailors at the 2000 Summer Olympics – Mistral One Design